State Highway 173 runs entirely inside the Erode district in the South Indian state of Tamil Nadu, India. It connects the city of Erode with Thingalur.

Route 
The highway passes through Nasiyanur, Pethampalayam and Nallampatti extending to a length of 26 km.

Major junctions 

 State Highway 96 at Erode
 Erode Ring Road (MDR-62) at Villarasampatti
 National Highway NH-544 (Old NH-47) at Perundurai

References

State highways in Tamil Nadu
Transport in Erode